This is a timeline of artists, albums, and events in progressive rock and its subgenres. This article contains the timeline for the period 1970–1979.

Contents
1970 – 1971 – 1972 – 1973 – 1974 – 1975 – 1976 – 1977 – 1978 – 1979

 See also
 Links and references


1970

Newly formed bands

Albums

Disbandments
 The Beatles
 Dogovor iz 1804.
 The Nice
 Organisation
 Quill
 Sam Gopal

Events
 Peter Banks leaves Yes, being replaced by former Bodast and Tomorrow guitarist Steve Howe.
 Anthony Phillips leaves Genesis, and is replaced by guitarist Steve Hackett. Genesis also changes drummers, losing John Mayhew and bringing in former child actor Phil Collins.
 Jan Akkerman and Pierre van der Linden leave Brainbox for Focus.

1971

Newly formed bands

Albums

Disbandments
 Nirvana

Events
 The new King Crimson that Bill Bruford joins has former Family bassist John Wetton.
 Yes fires organist Tony Kaye, and replaces him with former Strawbs keyboard player and session musician Rick Wakeman.

1972

Newly formed bands

Albums

Disbandments
 Brainbox
 Khan
 Matching Mole
 Van der Graaf Generator

1973

Newly formed bands 
 Clearlight 
 Etron Fou Leloublan
 Happy the Man
 Journey
 Opus
 Tempest

Albums

Disbandments
 Jackson Heights
 Marsupilami

Events
 Rick Wakeman leaves Yes after concluding the band's Tales From Topographic Oceans Tour. He would enjoy a long solo career following the success of his albums Six Wives of Henry VIII and Journey to the Center of the Earth. He is replaced by former Refugee keyboard player Patrick Moraz.
 Founding member Phil Schulman leaves Gentle Giant.

1974

Newly formed bands 
 Bijelo Dugme
 Klaatu
 Refugee
 SBB
 Tako
 Univers Zero

Albums

Disbandments
 King Crimson
 Korni Grupa 
 Supersister

Events
 John Rutsey leaves Rush to be replaced by Neil Peart.

1975

Newly formed bands 
 Ambrosia
 National Health
 September
 Triana

Reformed bands 
Van Der Graaf Generator

Albums

Disbandments
 DAG
 Hatfield and the North
 Fusion Orchestra disband in May after six years of touring. This had been the band's eighth line-up. Only drummer Dave Bell remained from the original band, formed in 1969. Co-founder Col Dawson had left at the end of December 1974.
 Porodična Manufaktura Crnog Hleba
 The Mothers of Invention

Events
 Vocalist Peter Gabriel leaves Genesis at the end of The Lamb Lies Down on Broadway tour. The band's drummer, Phil Collins, steps up to be lead singer and frontman after the band auditions some 450 singers.  Gabriel then embarks on a solo career.
 Former Pink Floyd frontman, Syd Barrett, overweight and bald, goes to Abbey Road Studios to ask if he can rejoin the band, they turn him down. The visit caused the band much distress. The band were recording the backing vocals for "Shine On You Crazy Diamond", a song about Barrett's demise.
 Bassist Mario Mutis leaves Los Jaivas.
 Yugoslav band Dah moves to Belgium, where they change their name to Land.

1976

Newly formed bands 
 Brand X
 Igra Staklenih Perli
 The Alan Parsons Project

Albums

Disbandments
 10cc: Kevin Godley and Lol Creme leave to pursue solo projects.
 Curved Air
 Dah
 Deep Purple

Events

1977

Newly formed bands 
 Aksak Maboul
 Cardiacs
 Crack
 Galija
 Gordi
 Predmestje
 Saga
 Témpano
 Toto
 U.K.

Albums

Disbandments
Hobo

Events
 Abortive supergroup British Bulldog with John Wetton, Rick Wakeman and Bill Bruford only play a few rehearsals.
 Patrick Moraz is fired from Yes to allow Rick Wakeman to re-join.
 Guitarist Steve Hackett departs Genesis to pursue solo work.

1978

Newly formed bands

Albums

Disbandments
 Elonkorjuu
 Emerson, Lake & Palmer
 Henry Cow
 Oko
 Pop Mašina
 Van der Graaf Generator

Events
 Rock in Opposition (RIO) is formed by Henry Cow, Stormy Six, Samla Mammas Manna, Univers Zero and Etron Fou Leloublan at the first RIO festival in London on 12 March. Art Zoyd, Art Bears and Aksak Maboul join RIO in December.

1979

Newly formed bands 
 Marillion
 The Mnemonist Orchestra (developed into Biota)
 Na Lepem Prijazni

Albums

Disbandments
 Opus
 September
 U.K.

Events
 Rick Wright of Pink Floyd is fired from the band by bassist Roger Waters. However he is allowed back on "The Wall" tour as a paid session musician.
 Jon Anderson and Rick Wakeman leave Yes. They were replaced by Trevor Horn and Geoff Downes of The Buggles respectively.
 Mario Mutis rejoined Los Jaivas.

See also
 Timeline of progressive rock: other decades: 1960s – 1980s – 1990s – 2000s – 2010s – 2020s
 Timeline of progressive rock (Parent article)
 Progressive rock
 Canterbury Scene
 Symphonic rock
 Avant-rock
 Rock in Opposition
 Neo-prog
 Progressive metal
 Jazz fusion

Further reading
 Snider, Charles. The Strawberry Bricks Guide To Progressive Rock. Chicago, Ill.: Lulu Publishing (2008) 364 pages,  (paperback). A veritable record guide to progressive rock, with band histories, musical synopses and critical commentary, all presented in the historical context of a timeline.
 Lucky, Jerry.  The Progressive Rock Files Burlington, Ontario: Collector's Guide Publishing, Inc (1998), 304 pages,  (paperback).  Gives an overview of progressive rock's history as well as histories of the major and underground bands in the genre.
 Macan, Edward.  Rocking the Classics:  English Progressive Rock and the Counterculture. Oxford:  Oxford University Press (1997), 290 pages,  (hardcover),  (paperback).  Analyzes progressive rock using classical musicology and also sociology.

Timeline
Progressive rock
Timeline of progressive rock
1970s in music
Music history by genre